The Borovkov-Florov I-207  (Istrebitel – fighter) was a fighter aircraft designed and built in the USSR from 1936.

Development 
In 1935, two designers from GAZ-21 (Gosoodarstvenny Aviatsiya Zavod – state aviation plant/factory), at Gor'ky began work on a new high-speed biplane fighter design. Borovkov and Florov drew heavily on their experience working in the Polikarpov I-16 program, producing 'Prototype No.7211' (Izdeliye 7, Zavod 21, Samolyet 1 – article 7, factory 21, aircraft 1). The goal was the smallest possible aircraft with the most powerful engine then available in the Soviet Union, the  Mikulin M-85 14-cylinder radial, a licensed-built Gnome-Rhône K14 Mistral Major. The No.7211 was a sleek biplane with fully cantilever outer wings, the upper centre-section being supported by four well-streamlined cabane struts. The No.7211 performed its maiden flight on 1 June 1937, but crashed on take-off due to engine failure.
The first production prototype was powered by the  Shvetsov M-62 radial, (license-built Wright Cyclone). Retaining the open cockpit, it featured a smooth close fitting cowl, fixed landing gear, and was fully armed with four ShKAS 7.62-mm machine guns in the forward fuselage. It was first flown in April 1939 and led to improvements on the second production prototype.

One aircraft featured a retractable landing gear that rotated to lie flat in a small landing gear bay under the fuselage. This improved the top speed over the fixed gear version by 20 mph (32.5 km/h). Two aircraft reputedly saw combat in Finland during the Winter War, but there is little evidence for this. 
The fourth production prototype featured a fully enclosed cockpit, a geared M-63 engine and a large smooth spinner that gave the little airplane a dart-like look. Though performance was quite impressive for a biplane fighter, the type was not accepted for manufacture, and all testing came to a halt with the German invasion of 1941.

Variants 
 7211 – The initial prototype aircraft, with an M-85 engine assembled from parts imported from France, crashed on first take-off due to engine failure.
 I-207 – Four prototype and pre-production aircraft with M-62 engines.
 I-207/M-63 – Three aircraft with M-63 engines plus provision for two FAB-250 bombs or two Merkulin DM-4 ramjet boosters under the lower wings. One aircraft later fitted with retractable main undercarriage retracting rearwards and rotating 90° to lie flat in the lower wings.

Specifications (I-207)

See also

References

 Gunston, Bill. The Osprey Encyclopaedia of Russian Aircraft 1875 – 1995. London, Osprey. 1995. 
 Taylor, Michael J.H.   Jane's Encyclopedia of Aviation. Studio Editions. London. 1989.

External links

 http://www.ctrl-c.liu.se/misc/ram/x-florov.html 
 http://www.pavlamodels.cz/katalogy/detail.php?k=akk&c=72024
 http://www.internetmodeler.com/2000/december/first-looks/pavla_i207.htm 

Polikarpov aircraft
1930s Soviet fighter aircraft